Sannas Mudiyanselage Kshanika Kumari Hirimburegama (known as Kshanika Hirimburegama) (born 1 January 1958) is a Sri Lankan academic. She was the 17th Vice-Chancellor of the University of Colombo. Prior to the appointment she was Head of the Department of Plant Sciences and a member of the University Grants Commission of Sri Lanka. She vacated the position of Vice Chancellor when she assumed duties as the Chairperson of the University Grants Commission in 2013. She is the first lady Chairperson of the University Grants Commission in Sri Lanka. She is the current Sri Lankan Ambassador designate to France.

Early life and education 
Hirimburegama was born and raised in Colombo, her parents were Professor P. B. Sannasgala, noted oriental scholar and Nalini Ratnayaka, daughter of Abeyratne Ratnayaka, first Cabinet Minister of Food, Co-operatives and later Minister of Home Affairs. She is the fourth out of five daughters born to the Sannasgala family. Her early education was at Visakha Vidyalaya, Colombo.

She entered University of Colombo in 1977 and specialised in Botany. She then entered the Post Graduate Institute of Agriculture (PGIA), Peradeniya and passed out in 1985 with her Masters in Agricultural Sciences. In the same year she left for Belgium to join the Catholic University of Leuven for her PhD. Kshanika married Wijaya Hiriburegama in 1986 whom she met at University of Peradeniya.

Academic career
She and her husband returned to Sri Lanka in 1989 and joined the Botany Department in Colombo University as a Senior Lecturer in January, 1990. She was later made the Head of the Plant Sciences Department before she was appointed as Vice-chancellor in January, 2008.

See also
University of Colombo

External links

Sri Lankan women academics
Sri Lankan academic administrators
Sinhalese academics
Ambassadors of Sri Lanka to France
Vice-Chancellors of the University of Colombo
Academic staff of the University of Colombo
Alumni of the University of Colombo
Alumni of the University of Peradeniya
Alumni of Visakha Vidyalaya
Université catholique de Louvain alumni
Living people
1958 births